The Tebbu people (Chinese: Diebu ren, 迭部人) are a Tibetan-Himalayan ethnic group indigenous to the Min Mountains along the Bailong River and its tributaries in Tewo County and possibly the eastern part of Zhugqu County in southern Gansu Province, Tibet. They speak the Amdo Tibetan language. The Tebbu population is currently estimated at more than 20,000 individuals.

References 

 "The Land of the Tebbus", Joseph Rock, Geographical Journal, 81.2, February 1933, pages 108-110.
 China on the Wild Side: Explorations in the China-Tibet Borderlands, Volume 2: Qinghai and Gansu, Joseph Rock, Caravan Press, 2008. .
 Joshua Project description

Ethnic groups in China